Trnovec Bartolovečki is a municipality in Varaždin County, Croatia.

The municipality consists of 6 villages – Bartolovec, Trnovec, Šemovec, Štefanec, Zamlaka and Žabnik. The population of the municipality in the 2011 census was 6,884. The village of Trnovec had a population of 4,185 in the same census. The majority of the people living in the municipality are Croats.

The village of Trnovec is located around 6 kilometres from the centre of Varaždin, the county seat of Varaždin County. Varaždin Airport is located just outside the village. The entire municipality borders the shores of the Drava, especially Lake Varaždin, a reservoir built on the river.

References

Municipalities of Croatia
Populated places in Varaždin County